The Castle of the Calatravos is a castle in Alcañiz (Teruel), Spain, that belonged to the Order of Calatrava. This military order played an important role in the reconquest of the town in 1157; the oldest rooms in the building date back to the twelfth and thirteenth centuries. During the fourteenth and fifteenth centuries, elements of Mudéjar ornamentation were added both to the castle itself and to the walls that surrounded it. The late-Renaissance main façade was added in the eighteenth century. Since 1968 it houses a Parador hotel.

Gallery

References

External links

 Hotel website

Paradores
Mudéjar architecture in Aragon
Castles in Aragon
Bien de Interés Cultural landmarks in the Province of Teruel
Order of Calatrava